Skye Chan  (Pinyin: Chén Qiànyáng; Yale: Chan4 Sin6 Yeung4) (born October 13, 1983) is a Hong Kong actress and Miss Hong Kong 2008 first runner-up. She represented Hong Kong in Miss World 2008 where she did not place, and in Miss Chinese International 2009 where she was crowned 1st runner-up. Following her win, she became an actress for TVB and a language translator, as she can speak four languages: English, Japanese, Mandarin, and Cantonese.

Before her current career, Chan was a flight attendant with Cathay Pacific and studied at Chinese University of Hong Kong.

Filmography

External links
 Miss Chinese International 2009 Official Website
 Miss HK profile
Official Blog

1983 births
Living people
Alumni of the Chinese University of Hong Kong
Hong Kong film actresses
Hong Kong television actresses
Miss World 2008 delegates
TVB actors
Hong Kong beauty pageant winners
21st-century Hong Kong actresses
Flight attendants